Grattan Henry Wheeler (August 25, 1783 – March 11, 1852) was an American politician from New York.

Life
Grattan H. Wheeler was born near Providence, Rhode Island on August 25, 1783. He was the son of Silas Wheeler (1752–1827), a veteran of the American Revolution who took part in the burning of the Gaspée.

Later in the Revolution, Silas Wheeler joined the crew of a privateer. He was captured by the British and jailed in Kinsale, Ireland. He escaped with the help of the Irish Patriot, Henry Grattan. In gratitude, Silas Wheeler named his son after Grattan.

Wheeler attended public and preparatory schools in Rhode Island. He moved to Steuben County, New York with his parents in 1800, and became a farmer, lumberman and winemaker. The Wheeler family founded Wheeler, the Steuben County town that was named for them.

Wheeler was active in the New York Militia, and attained the rank of Lieutenant Colonel as a member of the 96th Infantry Regiment.  He also served as Wheeler's Town Supervisor from 1823 to 1824.

He was a member of the New York State Assembly in 1822, 1824 and 1826.

He was a member of the New York State Senate from 1828 to 1831, sitting in the 51st, 52nd, 53rd and 54th New York State Legislatures.

Wheeler was elected as an Anti-Mason to the 22nd United States Congress, holding office from March 4, 1831 to March 3, 1833.

He was a presidential elector on the Whig ticket in 1840, voting for William Henry Harrison and John Tyler.

Wheeler died in Wheeler on March 11, 1852.  He was buried at the Wheeler Family Cemetery in Wheeler.

References

External links

Grattan H. Wheeler at The Political Graveyard

1783 births
1852 deaths
Politicians from Providence, Rhode Island
New York (state) Democratic-Republicans
Anti-Masonic Party members of the United States House of Representatives from New York (state)
New York (state) Whigs
1840 United States presidential electors
People from Wheeler, New York
Members of the New York State Assembly
New York (state) state senators
19th-century American politicians